The Texas, Gonzales and Northern Railway is a short-line railroad that operates  of track between Harwood, Texas and Gonzales, Texas.

References

External links

Switching and terminal railroads
Texas railroads